Ysbyty George Thomas (English: George Thomas Hospital) is a health facility on Cwmparc Road, Treorchy, Rhondda Cynon Taf, Wales. It is managed by the Cwm Taf Morgannwg University Health Board.

History
The facility was officially opened by the former Speaker of the House of Commons, Lord Tonypandy, after which it is named, in 1991. The new facility was built on the site of a former coal mine. In 2018 three wards were closed to facilitate the creation of a health and well-being centre.

References

Hospitals in Rhondda Cynon Taf
Hospitals established in 1991
1991 establishments in Wales
Hospital buildings completed in 1991
Buildings and structures in Rhondda Cynon Taf
NHS hospitals in Wales
Cwm Taf Morgannwg University Health Board